Caroline Aiken (born August 8, 1955) is a singer and guitarist from Atlanta, Georgia whose work spans genres, from folk to blues to rock. Aiken has released nine albums and performed with Bonnie Raitt and the Indigo Girls.

Caroline currently resides in Athens, GA and also teaches workshops on songwriting and performing.

References

External resources

1955 births
Living people
Folk musicians from Georgia (U.S. state)
20th-century American guitarists
21st-century American women singers
21st-century American singers
20th-century American women guitarists
Singer-songwriters from Georgia (U.S. state)